The Lehigh Valley Railroad Engine House is a former railroad repair shop, or "engine house" at 99 Towanda Street, White Haven, Pennsylvania. It was built in 1889 as a more permanent structure for the repair shop belonging to the Lehigh Valley Railroad Company, and now serves as a community library.

History 

This White Haven engine house was damaged by a train derailment in 1973 and was repaired with concrete blocks and mortar. In 2002, responding to citizen demands, the borough purchased the engine house from its private owner. It now serves the community as the community library.

References

Further reading 
History of The Lehigh Valley Railroad Engine House. White Haven Area Community Library

Transportation buildings and structures in Luzerne County, Pennsylvania
Lehigh Valley Railroad
1889 establishments in Pennsylvania
Buildings and structures completed in 1889